Arisaema pusillum is a species of flowering plant in the arum family Araceae. It is a member of the Arisaema triphyllum complex, a group of closely-related taxa in eastern North America. The specific name pusillum, which means "very small, slender", describes the overall size of the plant relative to that of the more common Arisaema triphyllum. It is commonly known as the small Jack-in-the-pulpit (or small Jack). It is sometimes referred to as the swamp Jack, not to be confused with Arisaema stewardsonii, which is also known by that name.

Description
Arisaema pusillum is a herbaceous, perennial, flowering plant growing from a corm. Like other members of the Arisaema triphyllum complex, it has three leaflets per leaf.

Similar species
The overall habit and character of Arisaema pusillum is very similar to that of Arisaema stewardsonii but the latter is easily distinguished by its strongly fluted spathe tube. Arisaema pusillum is less like Arisaema triphyllum sensu stricto, but since a diagnostic character is lacking, the two species are more difficult to distinguish in practice. The following table of characters compares the three species side-by-side:

Taxonomy
Arisaema pusillum was first described as Arisaema triphyllum var. pusillum by Charles Horton Peck in his Report of the State Botanist of 1897. Peck's description was based on a specimen collected by Fred Thorne in Millbrook, New York, also in 1897. The variety was given species rank by the American botanist George Valentine Nash in 1901. , the name Arisaema pusillum  is widely recognized.

Arisaema pusillum is a member of the Arisaema triphyllum complex, a group of closely-related taxa that also includes Arisaema acuminatum, Arisaema quinatum, Arisaema stewardsonii, and Arisaema triphyllum. , some authorities consider Arisaema pusillum to be a synonym for Arisaema triphyllum or A. triphyllum subsp. pusillum, However, most authorities accept Arisaema pusillum and the other species-level members of the complex.

Distribution and habitat
Arisaema pusillum is found primarily in the eastern United States, from Louisiana and Mississippi, northward to New York and southern New England. Some sources claim that it occurs as far north as Ontario and Quebec in eastern Canada, while others claim its range extends to New York and southeastern Connecticut but no further. In the southeastern United States, it is common throughout the Appalachian Mountains, from northern Alabama to West Virginia.

Conservation
The global conservation status of Arisaema pusillum is unknown. Based on the conservation status of Arisaema triphyllum subsp. pusillum, it may be inferred that Arisaema pusillum is globally secure (G5). It is uncommon (or worse) in New York (S3?), Quebec (S2?), Illinois (S1S2), and West Virginia (S1).

References

Bibliography

External links
 
 

pusillum
Flora of the Eastern United States
Plants described in 1897
Taxa named by George Valentine Nash
Flora without expected TNC conservation status